Joculusium muizoni is a fossil species discovered at the Riversleigh World Heritage Area. Little is known about the animal.

Taxonomy 
The species describes a fossilised specimen of an unknown family, but allied to the order Dasyuromorphia with reasonable confidence by the author Stephen Wroe. The holotype and only sole known specimen is a lower jaw bone. The epithet of the species muizoni honours the palaeontologist Christian de Muizon and its new genus Joculusium was named in reference to the type locality.

Description 
Joculusium muizoni is a fossil species of dasyuromorph, an order of marsupials represented in the modern Australian fauna by the quolls (Dasyuridae), Tasmanian devil and recently extinct thylacine (Thylacinidae). When discovered, the specimen exhibited the least derived characteristics of the known species of the order that was found in dasyurid and thylacinid families. The only specimen is a jaw bone of a carnivore that probably ate smaller vertebrate species or insects.

Distribution 
The type locality is middle Miocene (Faunal Zone C, circa 14 myr) at the Riversleigh World Heritage Area, which at that time was a wetter environment dominated by rainforest.

References 

Prehistoric dasyuromorphs
Fossil taxa described in 2011
Prehistoric marsupial genera
Riversleigh fauna